Seròs is a municipality in the comarca of the Segrià in Catalonia, Spain. It is situated on the right bank of the Segre river in the south-west of the comarca. The Aragon and Catalonia canal provides irrigation water for growing fruit. The municipality is linked to the rest of the comarca and to Fraga (comarca of Baix Cinca, Aragon) by the C-242 road.

Demography

See also
Montmeneu

References

 Panareda Clopés, Josep Maria; Rios Calvet, Jaume; Rabella Vives, Josep Maria (1989). Guia de Catalunya, Barcelona: Caixa de Catalunya.  (Spanish).  (Catalan).

External links
Official website 
 Government data pages 

Municipalities in Segrià
Populated places in Segrià